This is a list of the flora of South Georgia, an island in the subantarctic Atlantic Ocean, part of the British overseas territory of South Georgia and the South Sandwich Islands. There are 26 native plant species, and there has been 76 species of introduced plants recorded on the island.

Introduced species tend to be located in the areas of human settlement, such as the former sealing and whaling stations.

Introduced species

References

 
Lists of plants